Stranahan Run is a  long tributary to East Branch Oil Creek in Crawford County, Pennsylvania.

Course
Stranahan Run rises on the Britton Run divide about 1.5 miles northwest of Spartansburg, Pennsylvania.  Stranahan Run then flows northeast and southeast through the Erie Drift Plain to Clear Lake, in Spartansburg, Pennsylvania where it joins East Branch Oil Creek.

Watershed
Stranahan Run drains  of area, receives about 46.8 in/year of precipitation, has a topographic wetness index of 478.58 and is about 47% forested.

References

Additional Maps

Rivers of Pennsylvania
Rivers of Crawford County, Pennsylvania
Rivers of Erie County, Pennsylvania